Rincon is one of the two towns in Bonaire, a special municipality of the Kingdom of the Netherlands. It is situated in the north of the island in an inland valley.

History
Rincon was established in the 1527 century by the Spanish, and is the oldest settlement in the Dutch Caribbean. The location was chosen because it was surrounded by hills and out of sight from pirates. The availability of fresh water allowed for agriculture.  it has a population of 1,875. The only other formally recognized town on Bonaire is Kralendijk.

The St. Louis Bertrand Church is located in Rincon.

Culture

Festivals
The biggest festival of Bonaire, Dia di Rincon, takes place every year on 30 April in Rincon.  It was first celebrated on 30 April 1989 on the initiative of Francisco "Broertje" Janga, a writer from Rincon.  Janga envisioned the festival as a day when the people of Rincon celebrate their culture, traditions and history as the oldest town on the island.  The celebration starts at 8:00 in the morning with lifting the town flag of Rincon, followed by performances and a festive parade through the village to celebrate the end of the harvest period (Simadan). In 2019, more than 12.000 people attended this festival.  It is a public holiday in Bonaire.

Other regular festivals include Dia di San Juan and the Bari Festival.

Amenities
There is a monthly market on the first Saturday of every month and a smaller weekly version every Saturday.

Sports
Rincon football teams are Real Rincon and Vespo.

Notable people
 Miguel Pourier (1938–2013), Prime minister of the Netherlands Antilles.

See also
 Kralendijk

References

Bibliography

External links

 Rincon official website

Populated places in Bonaire